is a Japanese kickboxer. A professional competitor since 2019, Hanaoka is the former KNOCK OUT Black Super Flyweight champion.

As of July 2022 he was the #3 ranked Strawweight in the world by Combat Press.

Biography and career

Early career

Professional career beginnings
After an amateur career of over 150 fights during which he amassed 28 titles, Hanaoka was scheduled to make his professional debut on May 19, 2019, against Korean fighter An Jong-Ho at the Japan Kickboxing Innovation "Join Forces 13" event. He won by technical knockout in the second round.

On November 1, 2019, Hanoaka made his debut for the KNOCK OUT promotion, he faced Hitoshi Sato at the KNOCK OUT 2019 BREAKING DAWN event. He won by unanimous decision.

Innovation flyweight champion
On August 23, 2020, Hanaoka won his first professional title when he defeated Daiya Oshikawa by unanimous decision after five rounds at Japan Kickboxing Innovation Join Forces 16 for the Flyweight title.

Hanaoka saw his winning streak broken on October 29, 2020, at the NO KICK NO LIFE "New Chapter" event when he faced HIROYUKI in a three-round fight that ended in a split draw.

Hanaoka faced Rising Chikara at Japan Kickboxing Innovation Champions Carnival 2020 on December 27, 2020. He won the fight by unanimous decision, with scores of 50–47, 50–46 and 49–46.

Hanaoka suffered his first professional loss on February 24, 2021, against Shimon Yoshinari at a NO KICK NO LIFE event where he was defeated by majority decision after five rounds.

After suffering his first professional loss, Hanaoka was booked to face Kiminori Matsuzaki at KNOCK OUT 2021 vol.2 on May 22, 2021. He won the fight by a second-round technical knockout, as the fight was stopped on the advice of the ringside physician due to a cut suffered by Matsuzaki.

Hanaoka was next booked to face the former Lumpinee Stadium champion Visanlek Meibukai at NO KICK NO LIFE Shin Shou Yuigadokuson on July 22, 2021. He won the fight by unanimous decision, with all three judges scoring the bout 30–28 in his favor.

Innovation and Knock Out flyweight champion
On September 25, 2021, Hanaoka participated in the KNOCK OUT Black Flyweight Championship tournament, held to crown the inaugural flyweight champion. In the semi-final he defeated Kuryu by unanimous decision, with scores of 30–29, 30–29 and 29–28. In the final he defeated Takumi Hamada by unanimous decision to capture his first K-1 rules kickboxing title.

Hanaoka faced Ryuto Oinuma at KNOCK OUT 2021 vol.6 on November 28, 2021. He won the fight by a first-round knockout, stopping Oinuma with a left hook to the body at the 2:24 minute mark of the opening round.

On January 9, 2022, Hanaoka faced his most notable opponent yet when matched with reigning Battle of MuayThai and WPMF World champion Issei Ishii at a NO KICK NO LIFE event. He created the surprise and won by unanimous decision after five rounds.

On March 13, 2022, Hanoka took part in the Japan Kickboxing Innovation Zaimax one night open finger gloves 4-man tournament. In the semi final he defeated HIROYUKI by unanimous decision after scoring a knockdown with a body shot in the second round. In the final he defeated Yu Hiramatsu by first-round knockout with a straight punch to the body to win the tournament and the 300,000 yen cash prize.

Hanoka was scheduled to face Phetsongchai Songnintai on April 27, 2022, at the Chakuriki 15 event. He won the fight by knockout, scoring three knockdowns in the first round.

RISE
Hanaoka made his promotional debut with RISE against Koudai Hirayama at RISE 159 on June 24, 2022. He won the fight by unanimous decision, with all three judges awarding him a 30–29 scorecard.

On July 28, 2022, Hashimoto Dojo revealed that Hanaoka had vacated the KNOCK OUT Black Super Flyweight title. On the same day, at a separate press conference held by RISE, it was announced that Hanaoka would face the second ranked RISE super flyweight contender Jin Mandokoro at RISE 161 on August 28, 2022. He won the fight by a third-round technical knockout. The fight was stopped 21 seconds into the round, due to a cut on Mandokoro's eyelid.

Hanaoka faced the #12 ranked Tsubasa at RISE World Series 2022 on October 15, 2022. He was dismissive of his opponent during the pre-fight press conference, stating: "I want to show there's a difference between top ranked and bottom ranked fighters". Hanaoka lost the fight by an upset technical decision, with all three judges scoring it 20–19 for Tsubasa. The bout was stopped four seconds before the second round expired, due to an accidental clash of heads which left a cut above Tsubasa's right eye.

Hanaoka took part in a NO KICK NO LIFE bantamweight tournament, the quarterfinals of which were held on February 11, 2023. He overcame Sanchai TeppenGym by split decision in the quarterfinals and advanced to the semifinals, which were held on May 21, 2023, where he faced Koki Yamada.

Championships and accomplishments

Professional
Japan Kickboxing Innovation
 2020 INNOVATION Flyweight Champion
 2022 ZAIMAX MUAYTHAI -53 kg Tournament Winner
KNOCK OUT
 2021 KNOCK OUT Black Super Flyweight Champion

Amateur
 2014 Battle of Muay Thai -28.5 kg Champion
 2014 Battle of Muay Thai -30 kg Tournament Winner
 2014 Windy Sports Muay Thai -30 kg Champion
 2015 All Japan Jr. Kick Tournament -30 kg Winner
 2015 WPMF M-ONE Weerasakreck -30 kg Champion
 2015 SMASHERS -35 kg Champion & Excellent Fighter Award
 2015 Wan Kingthong Real Champion Tournament -34 kg Winner
 2015 MuayThaiOpen -35 kg Champion
 2016 Wan Kingthong Real Champion Tournament -38 kg Winner
 2016 WPMF M-ONE Weerasakreck -35 kg Champion
 2016 REBELS Blow Cup -40 kg Winner & Event MVP
 2016 WBC Muay Thai All Japan Jr. League Middle School -34 kg runner-up
 2016 SMASHERS -40 kg Champion
 2016 NJKF Explosion -37 kg Champion
 2017 WPMF M-ONE Weerasakreck -45 kg Champion
 2017 Lumpinee Boxing Stadium of Japan -45 kg Champion
 2017 All Japan SMASHERS -45 kg Champion
 2017 NJKF Explosion -45 kg Champion
 2017 WPMF M-ONE Weerasakreck -50 kg Champion
 2017 SMASHERS -50 kg Champion
 2018 WPMF M-ONE Weerasakreck -50 kg Champion
 2018 WBC Muay Thai All Japan Jr. League -50 kg Champion and Best Fighter Award
 2018 Lumpinee Boxing Stadium of Japan U-15 Flyweight Champion

Fight record

|-  style="background:#;"
| 2023-05-21 || ||align=left| Koki Yamada || NO KICK NO LIFE Okayama Gym 50th Anniversary Event - Bantamweight Tournament, Semi Final|| Tokyo, Japan ||  ||  || 

|-  style="background:#cfc;"
| 2023-02-11|| Win ||align=left| Sanchai TeppenGym|| NO KICK NO LIFE - Bantamweight Tournament, Quarter Final|| Tokyo, Japan || Decision (Split) || 3 || 3:00 

|-  style="text-align:center; background:#fbb"
| 2022-10-15 || Loss ||align=left| Tsubasa || RISE World Series 2022 || Tokyo, Japan || Tech. Decision (Unanimous) || 2 ||2:56 
|-
|-  style="background:#cfc;"
| 2022-08-28|| Win ||align=left| Jin Mandokoro || RISE 161 || Tokyo, Japan || TKO (Doctor stoppage) || 3 || 0:21

|-  style="text-align:center; background:#cfc;"
| 2022-06-24|| Win ||align=left| Koudai || RISE 159 || Tokyo, Japan || Decision (Unanimous)|| 3 ||3:00

|-  style="text-align:center; background:#cfc"
| 2022-04-27|| Win ||align=left| Phetsongchai Sor Ninthai || Chakuriki 15 Fujiwara Festival || Tokyo, Japan || TKO (3 Knockdown) || 1 || 2:55

|-  style="text-align:center; background:#cfc;"
| 2022-03-13|| Win || align=left| Yu Hiramatsu || Japan Kickboxing Innovation Okayama Gym Show 8 - Zaimax Muaythai Tournament, Final|| Okayama, Japan || KO (Straight to the body) || 1 || 1:37
|-
! style=background:white colspan=9 |

|-  style="text-align:center; background:#cfc;"
| 2022-03-13|| Win || align=left| HIROYUKI || Japan Kickboxing Innovation Okayama Gym Show 8 - Zaimax Muaythai Tournament, Semi Final|| Okayama, Japan || Decision (Unanimous)|| 3 || 3:00

|-  style="text-align:center; background:#cfc;"
| 2022-01-09|| Win || align=left| Issei Ishii||  NO KICK NO LIFE || Tokyo, Japan || Decision (Unanimous) ||5 ||3:00

|-  style="text-align:center; background:#cfc;"
| 2021-11-28|| Win ||align=left| Ryuto Oinuma || KNOCK OUT 2021 vol.6  || Tokyo, Japan || KO (Left hook to the body)  ||1 ||2:24

|-  style="text-align:center; background:#cfc;"
| 2021-09-25|| Win ||align=left| Takumi Hamada || KNOCK OUT 2021 vol.4 - Super Flyweight Championship Tournament, Final || Tokyo, Japan || Decision (Unanimous) || 3 ||3:00
|-
! style=background:white colspan=9 |

|-  style="text-align:center; background:#cfc;"
| 2021-09-25|| Win ||align=left| Kuryu || KNOCK OUT 2021 vol.4 - Super Flyweight Championship Tournament, Semi Final || Tokyo, Japan || Decision (Unanimous) || 3 ||3:00

|-  style="text-align:center; background:#cfc;"
| 2021-07-22|| Win || align=left| Visanlek Meibukai || NO KICK NO LIFE Shin Shou Yuigadokuson|| Tokyo, Japan || Decision (Unanimous)  || 3 ||3:00

|-  style="text-align:center; background:#cfc;"
| 2021-05-22|| Win ||align=left| Kiminori Matsuzaki ||KNOCK OUT 2021 vol.2 ||  Tokyo, Japan || TKO (Doctor Stoppage)|| 2 || 2:46

|-  style="text-align:center; background:#fbb;"
| 2021-02-24|| Loss|| align=left| Shimon Yoshinari || NO KICK NO LIFE Shin Shou Ungaisouten|| Tokyo, Japan || Decision (Majority) || 5 || 3:00

|-  style="text-align:center; background:#cfc;"
| 2020-12-27|| Win || align=left| Rising Chikara || Japan Kickboxing Innovation Champions Carnival 2020 || Tokyo, Japan || Decision (Unanimous) || 5 || 3:00

|-  style="text-align:center; background:#c5d2ea;"
| 2020-10-29|| Draw ||align=left| HIROYUKI || NO KICK NO LIFE ~Shin Shou~ ||  Tokyo, Japan || Decision (Split) || 3 || 3:00

|-  style="text-align:center; background:#cfc;"
| 2020-08-23|| Win ||align=left| Daiya Oshikawa || Japan Kickboxing Innovation Join Forces 16 ||  Tokyo, Japan || Decision (Unanimous) || 5|| 3:00 
|-
! style=background:white colspan=9 |

|-  style="text-align:center; background:#cfc;"
| 2019-12-01 ||Win ||align=left| Bangsaphan SaenchaiGym|| MuayThaiOpen 47 ||  Tokyo, Japan || Decision (Unanimous)||3 ||3:00

|-  style="text-align:center; background:#cfc;"
| 2019-11-01|| Win||align=left| Hitoshi Sato || KNOCK OUT 2019 BREAKING DAWN ||  Tokyo, Japan ||Decision (Unanimous) ||3 || 3:00

|-  style="text-align:center; background:#cfc;"
| 2019-07-15|| Win||align=left| Yu Hiramatsu || Japan Kickboxing Innovation Join Forces 14 ||  Tokyo, Japan ||TKO (Referee stoppage)  ||3 || 2:21

|-  style="text-align:center; background:#cfc;"
| 2019-05-19|| Win||align=left| Ahn Jeong-ho || Japan Kickboxing Innovation Join Forces 13 ||  Tokyo, Japan ||TKO (Referee stoppage) ||2 || 1:20

|-
| colspan=9 | Legend:    

|-  style="text-align:center; background:#cfc;"
| 2018-08-05|| Win || align=left| Ryoga Terayama || WBC Muay Thai All Japan Junior League, Final || Tokyo, Japan || Decision ||2 ||1:30
|-
! style=background:white colspan=9 |

|-  style="text-align:center; background:#cfc;"
| 2018-08-05|| Win || align=left| Shoryu Kishimoto|| WBC Muay Thai All Japan Junior League, Semi Final || Tokyo, Japan || Decision ||2 ||1:30

|-  style="text-align:center; background:#cfc;"
| 2018-08-05|| Win || align=left| Sojiro Kawaguchi || WBC Muay Thai All Japan Junior League, Quarter Final || Tokyo, Japan || Decision ||2 ||1:30

|-  style="text-align:center; background:#cfc;"
| 2018-07-22 || Win ||align=left| Toranosuke Matsuda || MuayThaiOpen 42||  Tokyo, Japan || TKO || 2 || 1:12

|-  style="text-align:center; background:#cfc;"
| 2018-07-08 || Win ||align=left| Ryoga Terayama || NJKF Explosion 16, WBC Muay Thai Jr League Selection Tournament, Final ||  Tokyo, Japan ||Decision || 2 || 1:30

|-  style="text-align:center; background:#cfc;"
| 2018-07-08 || Win ||align=left| Seima Suga || NJKF Explosion 16, WBC Muay Thai Jr League Selection Tournament, Semi Final ||  Tokyo, Japan ||Decision || 2 || 1:30

|-  style="text-align:center; background:#cfc;"
| 2018-06-03 || Win ||align=left| Eiji Katsura || WPMF Amateur 101 ||  Tokyo, Japan ||Decision (Unanimous)  ||  ||  
|-
! style=background:white colspan=9 |

|-  style="text-align:center; background:#cfc;"
| 2018-05-13 || Win ||align=left| Hiroa Sakurai || JAKF SMASHERS 194 ||  Tokyo, Japan ||Decision (Unanimous)  || 3 || 1:30  
|-
! style=background:white colspan=9 |

|-  style="text-align:center; background:#cfc;"
| 2018-04-30 || Win ||align=left| Yusei Shirahata || MuayThaiOpen 41||  Tokyo, Japan ||Decision || 3 || 3:00

|-  style="text-align:center; background:#cfc;"
| 2018-04-15 || Win ||align=left| Hiroa Sakurai || NJKF Explosion 15 ||  Tokyo, Japan ||Decision || 2 || 1:30

|-  style="text-align:center; background:#fbb;"
| 2018-04-01 || Loss ||align=left| Kazuto Nishimoto || WPMF Amateur 100 M-ONE  ||  Tokyo, Japan ||Decision || 2 || 1:30 
|-
! style=background:white colspan=9 |

|-  style="text-align:center; background:#fbb;"
| 2018-03-11 || Loss ||align=left| Koyata Yamada || Shootboxing Amateur ||  Tokyo, Japan ||Decision (Unanimous) ||2 || 2:00

|-  style="text-align:center; background:#fbb;"
| 2018-03-04 || Loss ||align=left| Eiji Katsura || WINDY Super Fight 8 - Kick Tournament, Final||  Tokyo, Japan ||Decision (Split) ||3 || 2:00
|-
! style=background:white colspan=9 |

|-  style="text-align:center; background:#cfc;"
| 2018-03-04 || Win ||align=left| Takumi Fujita || WINDY Super Fight 8 - Kick Tournament, Semi Final||  Tokyo, Japan ||Decision (Majority) || 2 || 1:30

|-  style="text-align:center; background:#cfc;"
| 2018-03-04 || Win ||align=left| Hiroa Sakurai || WINDY Super Fight 8 - Kick Tournament, Quarter Final||  Tokyo, Japan ||Decision (Unanimous) || 2 || 1:30

|-  style="text-align:center; background:#cfc;"
| 2018-02-22 || Win ||align=left| Ren || WPMF Amateur 99 ||  Tokyo, Japan ||||  ||

|-  style="text-align:center; background:#cfc;"
| 2018-02-11 || Win ||align=left| Yuki Baba || Muay Thai Super Fight Suk Wan Kingtong vol.10||  Tokyo, Japan ||Decision || 2 || 2:00

|-  style="text-align:center; background:#cfc;"
| 2018-02-04 || Win ||align=left| Hiroa Sakurai || NJKF Explosion 14 ||  Tokyo, Japan ||Decision || 2 || 1:30

|-  style="text-align:center; background:#cfc;"
| 2018-01-21|| Win ||align=left| Asato Nishiyama  || SMASHERS 192 ||  Tokyo, Japan ||Decision (Unanimous) ||  ||

|-  style="text-align:center; background:#cfc;"
| 2017-12-30 || Win ||align=left| Riku Kondo || KAMINARIMON Junior -45 kg Tournamrnt, Final||  Tokyo, Japan || Decision (Unanimous)||  ||

|-  style="text-align:center; background:#cfc;"
| 2017-12-30 || Win ||align=left| Ryogo Komiyama || KAMINARIMON Junior -45 kg Tournamrnt, Semi Final||  Tokyo, Japan || Ext.R Decision (Unanimous)||  ||

|-  style="text-align:center; background:#cfc;"
| 2017-12-17 || Win ||align=left| Hiroto Inoue || SMASHERS Jr Champions Carnival 2017||  Tokyo, Japan ||Decision (Unanimous) || ||  
|-
! style=background:white colspan=9 |

|-  style="text-align:center; background:#cfc;"
| 2017-11-26 || Win ||align=left| Yu Hiramatsu || MuayThaiOpen 40 ||  Tokyo, Japan ||Decision (Majority)  || 3 || 2:00 
|-
! style=background:white colspan=9 |

|-  style="text-align:center; background:#cfc;"
| 2017-09-18 || Win ||align=left| Yuma Ishiwatari || WPMF Amateur 96||  Tokyo, Japan ||  ||  ||  
|-
! style=background:white colspan=9 |

|-  style="text-align:center; background:#fbb;"
| 2017-09-03 || Loss ||align=left| Koyata Yamada || NJKF Explosion 12 ||  Tokyo, Japan ||Decision || 2 || 1:30

|-  style="text-align:center; background:#fbb;"
| 2017-08-07 || Loss ||align=left|  || WBC Muay Thai Jr League ||  Tokyo, Japan ||Decision || 2 || 1:30

|-  style="text-align:center; background:#cfc;"
| 2017-07-30 || Win ||align=left| Yusei Murai  || WPMF Amateur 95 ||  Tokyo, Japan ||Decision ||  ||

|-  style="text-align:center; background:#cfc;"
| 2017-07-09 || Win ||align=left| Yuma Ishiwatari || MuayThaiOpen 39 Lumpinee Boxing Stadium of Japan ||  Tokyo, Japan ||Decision (Majority)  || 3 || 2:00

|-  style="text-align:center; background:#cfc;"
| 2017-07-02 || Win ||align=left| Eiji Katsura || NJKF Explosion 11 ||  Tokyo, Japan ||Decision || 3 || 1:30 
|-
! style=background:white colspan=9 |

|-  style="text-align:center; background:#cfc;"
| 2017-06-25 || Win ||align=left| Shun Tsutsumi || 17th SMASHERS All Japan Tournament, Final||  Tokyo, Japan ||Decision (Unanimous)  ||  || 
|-
! style=background:white colspan=9 |

|-  style="text-align:center; background:#cfc;"
| 2017-06-25 || Win ||align=left| Shoma Ozaki || 17th SMASHERS All Japan Tournament, Semi Final||  Tokyo, Japan ||Decision (Unanimous)||  ||

|-  style="text-align:center; background:#cfc;"
| 2017-06-18 || Win ||align=left| Eiji Katsura ||WPMF Amateur 94 ||  Tokyo, Japan ||KO (Knee) || 3 ||  
|-
! style=background:white colspan=9 |

|-  style="text-align:center; background:#cfc;"
| 2017-05-28 || Win ||align=left| Toranosuke Matsuda || SMASHERS ||  Tokyo, Japan ||Decision (Unanimous)  ||  ||  
|-
! style=background:white colspan=9 |

|-  style="text-align:center; background:#cfc;"
| 2017-05-13 || Win ||align=left| Yuki Baba || Shootboxing Amateur 16 ||  Tokyo, Japan ||Decision (Unanimous)  ||  ||

|-  style="text-align:center; background:#cfc;"
| 2017-04-30 || Win ||align=left| Toranosuke Matsuda || Shuken 35 ||  Tokyo, Japan ||Decision (Unanimous)  ||  ||

|-  style="text-align:center; background:#cfc;"
| 2017-04-16 || Win ||align=left| Hikaru Sasaki || NJKF Explosion 10  ||  Tokyo, Japan ||Decision || 2 || 1:30

|-  style="text-align:center; background:#cfc;"
| 2017-04-02 || Win ||align=left| Yuki Baba || MuayThaiOpen38  ||  Tokyo, Japan ||Decision (Unanimous) || 3 || 2:00  
|-
! style=background:white colspan=9 |

|-  style="text-align:center; background:#cfc;"
| 2017-03-20 || Win ||align=left| Kazuto Nishimoto || WPMF Amateur 92 M-ONE  ||  Tokyo, Japan ||Decision (Split) ||  ||  
|-
! style=background:white colspan=9 |

|-  style="text-align:center; background:#cfc;"
| 2017-03-20 || Win ||align=left| Eiji Katsura || WPMF Amateur 92 M-ONE  ||  Tokyo, Japan ||||  ||

|-  style="text-align:center; background:#cfc;"
| 2017-03-11 || Win ||align=left| Yuki Baba || Shootboxing Amateur ||  Tokyo, Japan ||Decision (Unanimous)  ||  ||

|-  style="text-align:center; background:#cfc;"
| 2017-03-05 || Win ||align=left| Tenma Nagai || NJKF Explosion  9 ||  Tokyo, Japan ||Decision || 2 || 1:30 
|-
! style=background:white colspan=9 |

|-  style="text-align:center; background:#cfc;"
| 2017-02-19 || Win ||align=left| Ren || WPMF Amateur 91 ||  Tokyo, Japan ||Decision ||  ||

|-  style="text-align:center; background:#c5d2ea;"
| 2017-02-12 || Draw ||align=left| Tenma Nagai || NJKF Explosion 8||  Tokyo, Japan ||Decision || 2 || 1:30

|-  style="text-align:center; background:#c5d2ea;"
| 2017-02-12 || Draw ||align=left| Eiji Katsura || NJKF Explosion 8||  Tokyo, Japan ||Decision || 2 || 1:30

|-  style="text-align:center; background:#cfc;"
| 2016-12-25 || Win ||align=left| Yuki Baba || MuayThaiOpen 37 Lumpinee Boxing Stadium of Japan ||  Tokyo, Japan ||Decision (Unanimous)  || 3 || 2:00

|-  style="text-align:center; background:#fbb;"
| 2016-12-11 || Loss ||align=left| Ryoga Terayama || KAMINARIMON All Japan Junior, -40 kg Semi Final||  Tokyo, Japan ||Decision (Split)||  ||

|-  style="text-align:center; background:#cfc;"
| 2016-12-11 || Win ||align=left| Raize Umemoto || KAMINARIMON All Japan Junior, -40 kg Quarter Final||  Tokyo, Japan ||Decision (Unanimous) || ||

|-  style="text-align:center; background:#cfc;"
| 2016-11-25 || Win ||align=left| Asei Shimizu || JAKF SMASHERS 184||  Tokyo, Japan || KO || 2 ||0:52

|-  style="text-align:center; background:#cfc;"
| 2016-11-23 || Win ||align=left| Tenma || WPMF Amateur 89, Final  ||  Tokyo, Japan || ||  ||

|-  style="text-align:center; background:#cfc;"
| 2016-11-23 || Win ||align=left| Jinto Tokoro || WPMF Amateur 89, Semi Final  ||  Tokyo, Japan || ||  ||

|-  style="text-align:center; background:#fbb;"
| 2016-10-30 || Loss ||align=left| Ryoga Terayama || NJKF Explosion 7 ||  Tokyo, Japan ||Decision || 2 || 1:30

|-  style="text-align:center; background:#cfc;"
| 2016-10-02 || Win ||align=left|  Ryogo Komiyama || MuayThaiOpen 36 Lumpinee Boxing Stadium of Japan ||  Tokyo, Japan ||Decision (Unanimous)  || 3 || 2:00

|-  style="text-align:center; background:#cfc;"
| 2016-09-25 || Win ||align=left| Kira Okamatsu || WMPF Amateur 88||  Tokyo, Japan || ||  ||

|-  style="text-align:center; background:#cfc;"
| 2016-09-04 || Win ||align=left| Tenma Nagai || JAKF SMASHERS 183||  Tokyo, Japan ||Decision (Unanimous) || 3 || 1:30
|-
! style=background:white colspan=9 |

|-  style="text-align:center; background:#cfc;"
| 2016-08-28 || Win ||align=left| Aliyakare Yamamoto || NJKF Explosion 6 ||  Tokyo, Japan ||Decision || 2 || 1:30

|-  style="text-align:center; background:#cfc;"
| 2016-08-28 || Win ||align=left| Jinto Tokoro || NJKF Explosion 6 ||  Tokyo, Japan ||Decision || 2 || 1:30

|-  style="text-align:center; background:#fbb;"
| 2016-07-23|| Loss|| align=left| Shunpei Kitano  || 2nd WBC Muay Thai Jr League Tournament, Final|| Tokyo, Japan || Decision  || 2 ||1:30 
|-
! style=background:white colspan=9 |

|-  style="text-align:center; background:#cfc;"
| 2016-07-23|| Win || align=left| Luke Kondo  || 2nd WBC Muay Thai Jr League Tournament, Semi Final|| Tokyo, Japan || Decision  || 2 ||1:30

|-  style="text-align:center; background:#cfc;"
| 2016-07-17 || Win ||align=left| Ryogo Komiyama || MuayThaiOpen ||  Tokyo, Japan ||Decision  ||  ||

|-  style="text-align:center; background:#cfc;"
| 2016-05-22 || Win ||align=left| Tatsuki Shimizu || JAKF SMASHERS 181||  Tokyo, Japan ||Decision (Unanimous) ||  ||

|-  style="text-align:center; background:#cfc;"
| 2016-05-22 || Win ||align=left| Luke Kondo || JAKF SMASHERS 180||  Tokyo, Japan ||Decision (Unanimous) ||  ||

|-  style="text-align:center; background:#cfc;"
| 2016-05-22 || Win ||align=left| Jinto Tokoro || JAKF SMASHERS 180||  Tokyo, Japan ||Decision (Unanimous) ||  ||

|-  style="text-align:center; background:#cfc;"
| 2016-05-15 || Win ||align=left| Shota Noda || NJKF Explosion 5, inaugural -37 kg Championship Tournament, Final ||  Tokyo, Japan ||Decision || 2 || 1:30 
|-
! style=background:white colspan=9 |

|-  style="text-align:center; background:#cfc;"
| 2016-05-15 || Win ||align=left| Yuki Baba || NJKF Explosion 5, inaugural -37 kg Championship Tournament, Semi Final ||  Tokyo, Japan ||Decision || 2 || 1:30

|-  style="text-align:center; background:#cfc;"
| 2016-04-29 || Win ||align=left| Shoma Ozaki || JAKF SMASHERS 179 ||  Tokyo, Japan ||Decision (Unanimous) || 2 || 1:30

|-  style="text-align:center; background:#cfc;"
| 2016-04-03 || Win ||align=left| Hyouga || REBELS Blow Cup Tournament -40 kg, Final||  Tokyo, Japan || Decision (Unanimous) ||  || 
|-
! style=background:white colspan=9 |

|-  style="text-align:center; background:#cfc;"
| 2016-04-03 || Win ||align=left| Uyama || REBELS Blow Cup Tournament -40 kg, Semi Final||  Tokyo, Japan || Forfeit ||  ||

|-  style="text-align:center; background:#cfc;"
| 2016-04-03 || Win ||align=left| Riku Otsu || REBELS Blow Cup Tournament -40 kg, Quarter Final||  Tokyo, Japan || KO || 1 || 0:37

|-  style="text-align:center; background:#cfc;"
| 2016-03-29 || Win ||align=left| Shoma Ozaki || SMASHERS 179||  Tokyo, Japan ||Decision (Unanimous) || 2 ||1:30

|-  style="text-align:center; background:#cfc;"
| 2016-03-20 || Win ||align=left| Sho Osano || SMASHERS 178||  Tokyo, Japan ||Decision (Unanimous) || 2 || 1:30

|- style="text-align:center; background:#cfc;"
| 2016-03-13|| Win||align=left| Ryogo Komiyama || Muay 	Thai Super Fight Suk Wan Kingtong - Real Champion Tournament Final|| Tokyo, Japan || Decision  ||  ||
|-
! style=background:white colspan=9 |

|-  style="text-align:center; background:#cfc;"
| 2016-02-14 || Win ||align=left| Jinto Tokoro || WMPF Amateur 83||  Tokyo, Japan ||Decision ||  ||

|-  style="text-align:center; background:#cfc;"
| 2015-12-20|| Win || align=left| Shimon Yoshinari|| Suk Wan Kingthong, Real Champion Tournament 34 kg Final || Tokyo, Japan || Decision || ||

|-  style="text-align:center; background:#cfc;"
| 2015-12-20|| Win || align=left| Taichi Shirakawa|| Suk Wan Kingthong, Real Champion Tournament 34 kg Semi Final || Tokyo, Japan || Decision || ||

|-  style="text-align:center; background:#cfc;"
| 2015-12-13 || Win ||align=left|  || MuayThaiOpen 33 ||  Tokyo, Japan ||||  ||  
|-
! style=background:white colspan=9 |

|-  style="text-align:center; background:#cfc;"
| 2015-12-12 || Win ||align=left| Wataru Hiramatsu || JAKF "SMASHERS Champion's Carnival 2015" || Tokyo, Japan || Decision (unanimous) || 2 || 1:30 
|-
! style=background:white colspan=9 |

|-  style="text-align:center; background:#cfc;"
| 2015-12-06 || Win ||align=left| Miyu Sasaki || 8th National Junior Kick||  Tokyo, Japan ||Decision (Unanimous) ||  ||

|-  style="text-align:center; background:#cfc;"
| 2015-11-08|| Win ||align=left| Shota Noda || WPMF Amateur 81 ||  Tokyo, Japan || Decision|| ||

|-  style="text-align:center; background:#c5d2ea;"
| 2015-11-01|| Draw ||align=left| Shota Noda || NJKF Explosion ||  Tokyo, Japan ||Decision || 2 || 1:30

|-  style="text-align:center; background:#cfc;"
| 2015-10-18|| Win ||align=left| Raigo Miyazaki || SMASHERS 176 ||  Tokyo, Japan ||Decision (Unanimous) || 2 || 1:30

|-  style="text-align:center; background:#cfc;"
| 2015-09-27 || Win ||align=left|  || MuayThaiOpen 32 ||  Tokyo, Japan ||||  ||  
|-
! style=background:white colspan=9 |

|-  style="text-align:center; background:#fbb;"
| 2015-09-20|| Loss || align=left| Konosuke Nakamura || KAMINARIMON All Japan Tournament, Semi Finals|| Tokyo, Japan || Decision (Unanimous)|| 1||2:00

|-  style="text-align:center; background:#cfc;"
| 2015-09-20|| Win || align=left| Toki Oshika|| KAMINARIMON All Japan Tournament, Quarter Finals|| Tokyo, Japan || Decision (Unanimous)|| 1||2:00

|-  style="text-align:center; background:#fbb;"
| 2015-08-30|| Loss || align=left| Daiya Kira || 1st WBC Muay Thai Jr League, All Japan Tournament Final|| Tokyo, Japan || Decision || ||
|-
! style=background:white colspan=9 |

|-  style="text-align:center; background:#cfc;"
| 2015-08-30|| Win || align=left| Shota Noda || 1st WBC Muay Thai Jr League, All Japan Tournament Semi Final|| Tokyo, Japan || Decision || ||

|-  style="text-align:center; background:#cfc;"
| 2015-08-09 || Win ||align=left| Aliya Yamamoto || BRAVE 27 ||  Tokyo, Japan ||Decision (Unanimous) ||  ||

|-  style="text-align:center; background:#cfc;"
| 2015-08-09 || Win ||align=left| Atsuya Sato || BRAVE 27 ||  Tokyo, Japan ||Decision (Majority) ||  ||

|-  style="text-align:center; background:#fbb;"
| 2015-08-02|| Loss || align=left| Ryogo Komiyama || Suk Wan Kingthong, Real Champion Tournament 34 kg Final || Tokyo, Japan || Decision ||2 ||1:30

|-  style="text-align:center; background:#cfc;"
| 2015-08-02|| Win || align=left| Shimon Yoshinari || Suk Wan Kingthong, Real Champion Tournament 34 kg Semi Final || Tokyo, Japan || Decision ||2 ||1:30

|-  style="text-align:center; background:#cfc;"
| 2015-07-19|| Win|| align=left| Aliyakare Yamamoto|| JAKF SMASHERS 175, Final || Tokyo, Japan || Decision ||2 ||2:00

|-  style="text-align:center; background:#cfc;"
| 2015-07-19|| Win|| align=left| Wataru Hiramatsu || JAKF SMASHERS 175, Semi Final|| Tokyo, Japan || Decision ||2 ||2:00

|-  style="text-align:center; background:#fbb;"
| 2015-07-05 || Loss ||align=left| Shota Noda || NJKF Explosion ||  Tokyo, Japan ||Decision || 2 || 1:30

|-  style="text-align:center; background:#cfc;"
| 2015-06-14 || Win ||align=left| Yosuke Sekibara || SMASHERS 174||  Tokyo, Japan ||Decision (Unanimous) || 2 || 1:30

|-  style="text-align:center; background:#cfc;"
| 2015-04-29 || Win ||align=left| Taiji Shirakawa || NJKF Explosion ||  Tokyo, Japan ||Decision || 2 || 1:30

|-  style="text-align:center; background:#cfc;"
| 2015-04-29 || Win ||align=left| Ryoga Terayama || NJKF Explosion ||  Tokyo, Japan ||Decision || 2 || 1:30

|-  style="text-align:center; background:#cfc;"
| 2015-04-19 || Win ||align=left| Rui Ookubo || SMASHERS Wings ||  Tokyo, Japan ||Decision (Unanimous)||  ||

|-  style="text-align:center; background:#cfc;"
| 2015-03-15 || Win ||align=left| Rui Yamaguchi || 4th All Japan Jr. Kick -30 kg Tournament, Final||  Tokyo, Japan ||Decision (Unanimous) || 3 || 
|-
! style=background:white colspan=9 |

|-  style="text-align:center; background:#cfc;"
| 2015-03-15 || Win ||align=left|  || 4th All Japan Jr. Kick -30 kg Tournament, Semi Final||  Tokyo, Japan ||Decision  ||  ||

|-  style="text-align:center; background:#cfc;"
| 2015-03-15 || Win ||align=left|  || 4th All Japan Jr. Kick -30 kg Tournament, Quarter Final||  Tokyo, Japan ||Decision  ||  ||

|-  style="text-align:center; background:#fbb;"
| 2015-02-22 || Loss ||align=left| Ryogo Komiyama || 4th All Japan Jr. Kick Kanto -30 kg Tournament, Final||  Tokyo, Japan ||Decision ||  ||

|-  style="text-align:center; background:#cfc;"
| 2015-02-08 || Win ||align=left| Taichi Shirakawa || WPMF Amateur 75, -30 kg Tournament Final||  Tokyo, Japan || ||  || 
|-
! style=background:white colspan=9 |

|-  style="text-align:center; background:#cfc;"
| 2015-02-08 || Win ||align=left| Ryugo Hori || WPMF Amateur 75, -30 kg Tournament Semi Final||  Tokyo, Japan || ||  ||

|-  style="text-align:center; background:#cfc;"
| 2014-12-21 || Win||align=left| Shimon Yoshinari || WINDY SPORTS || Tokyo, Japan || Decision || 5 ||  
|-
! style=background:white colspan=9 |

|-  style="text-align:center; background:#cfc;"
| 2014-11-30 || Win||align=left| Shoma || TENKAICHI Fight || Tokyo, Japan || TKO || 1 || 0:55

|-  style="background:#cfc;"
| 2014-10-13|| Win||align=left| Maiku Tanaka || MUAYTHAI WINDY SUPER FIGHT vol.18 in Kyoto || Kyoto, Japan ||  Decision (Unanimous)  || 2 || 2:00

|-  style="text-align:center; background:#fbb;"
| 2014-10-19 || Loss ||align=left| Tenma || WPMF BOM Amateur ||  Kanagawa, Japan ||Decision || 2 || 2:00

|-  style="text-align:center; background:#cfc;"
| 2014-07-06 || Win ||align=left| Tenma|| BOM Amateur 7, -30 kg Tournament Final ||  Tokyo, Japan ||Decision ||  ||

|-  style="text-align:center; background:#cfc;"
| 2014-07-06 || Win ||align=left| Raize Umemoto || BOM Amateur 7, -30 kg Tournament Semi Final ||  Tokyo, Japan ||Decision ||  ||

|- style="text-align:center; background:#cfc;"
| 2014-06-29||Win|| align="left" | Haruyuki Tanitsu ||Muay Thai WINDY Super Fight vol.16||Tokyo, Japan|| Decision || 2 || 2:00

|-  style="text-align:center; background:#cfc;"
| 2014-05-06 || Win||align=left| Shimon Yoshinari || The Battle of Muay Thai Amateur 6 ||  Tokyo, Japan ||Decision || 3 || 2:00
|-
! style=background:white colspan=9 |

|-  style="text-align:center; background:#cfc;"
| 2014-01-19 || Win ||align=left| Shota Noda || BOM Amateur 4, Final||  Kanagawa, Japan ||Decision || 2 || 2:00

|-  style="text-align:center; background:#cfc;"
| 2014-01-19 || Win ||align=left| Shimon Yoshinari || BOM Amateur 4, Semi Final||  Kanagawa, Japan ||Decision || 2 || 2:00 
|-
| colspan=9 | Legend:

See also
 List of male kickboxers

References

2003 births
Living people
Japanese male kickboxers
Japanese Muay Thai practitioners
Sportspeople from Tokyo
People from Akishima, Tokyo
21st-century Japanese people